Markus Nenonen (born October 29, 1992) is a Finnish professional ice hockey player. He is currently playing for HPK of the Liiga.

Nenonen made his SM-liiga debut playing with JYP Jyväskylä during the 2012–13 SM-liiga season.

References

External links 

1992 births
Living people
Finnish ice hockey forwards
HPK players
JYP-Akatemia players
JYP Jyväskylä players
People from Jämsä
Tappara players
Vaasan Sport players
Sportspeople from Central Finland